I – Proud to Be an Indian is a 2004 Indian Hindi action drama film, written and directed by Puneet Sira and produced by Sohail Khan.

The film, about racism against Asians in London, was shot in a span of thirty days in the UK and was budgeted between Rs. 4.5 crore and Rs. 5 crore.

Plot
The film starts when a Sikh couple alight from a bus at night on an isolated street. The woman is pregnant. They are followed by racist goons and are attacked. Later, "I" along with his father reach London. They went to the house of their son who is living along with his wife, son and teenage daughter. Later, they see the news and learn that the bodies of a Sikh couple were found and it was a suspected racist attack. They attend the last rites of the deceased couple. Later on, the goons attack an Indian store owner. These goons believe that England belongs to white people. The family has to taste racism when Kamal (sister in law) of "I" is cornered and sexually humiliated. She returns home in shock. "I" learns of this and beats three white racist goons. But his brother didn't lodge a police complaint. Later on, "I" is attacked by a Pakistani who is running a boxing club. This attack is ordered by white racist goons as they don't want to attract police. Later on, "I" fights the gang leader of racist group, which "I" wins.

Cast
Sohail Khan as I
Kulbhushan Kharbanda as I's father
Aasif Sheikh as I's brother
Hina Tasleem as Noor Firoz
Tim Lawrence as Caine
Alex Mileman as Crumb
James Owen as Monk
Imran Ali Khan as Aslam
Kieran Markham as Wedding Guest

References

External links
 
I – Proud To Be An Indian @ Bollywood Hungama (IndiaFM)

2004 films
2000s Hindi-language films
British Indian films
Films about racism
Films shot in London
Indian pregnancy films